Scott Googins is an American college baseball coach who is the head coach of the University of Cincinnati Bearcats Baseball Team. Googins was hired on June 6, 2017. He left Xavier after being the skipper of the Musketeers baseball team since the start of the 2006 season.  Under Googins, Xavier appeared in three NCAA Tournaments.  In 2008, he was named the A-10 Coach of the Year, and in 2009, he was named the ABCA Mideast Region Coach of the Year.  Googins is an alumnus of Ohio Wesleyan University, where he played baseball for the Battling Bishops.

Coaching career

Assistant coaching
After graduating from Ohio Wesleyan in 1992, Googins became an assistant at Indiana under head coach Bob Morgan.  He held the position from 1993 to 2000.  During his tenure, Indiana appeared in the 1996 NCAA Tournament.  He then worked as an assistant at Miami (OH) from 2001 to 2004, serving under head coach Tracy Smith, who had been Googins's fellow assistant at Indiana for two seasons.  When Miami assistant Dan Simonds was tapped for the Xavier job following the 2004 season, Googins went with him as an assistant coach.

Xavier
After the 2005 season, Smith left Miami to succeed Morgan as Indiana's head coach, and Simonds went to Miami to take his place.  Googins was promoted to replace Simonds at Xavier.

In 2008, Googins's third season, Xavier went 27–31 (19–8 A-10) and shared the A-10 regular season title with Charlotte.  Googins was named the A-10 Coach of the Year.  In that year's A-10 Tournament, the Musketeers made the championship game but lost to Charlotte, 4–3 in 11 innings.

The following season, 2009, Xavier went 39–21 (18–9 A-10) and finished third in conference, qualifying for another A-10 Tournament.  There, the Musketeers won their opening game against Charlotte, 8–6, but lost their second to Rhode Island, 7–6.  Having to go undefeated for the rest of the tournament, the Musketeers won four straight games to win the title and qualify for the 2009 NCAA Tournament, the program's first.  As the third seed at the Houston Regional, Xavier went 1–2, dropping games to second-seeded Kansas State and host Rice but beating fourth-seeded Sam Houston State in an elimination game.  Googins was named the 2009 ABCA Mideast Region Coach of the Year.

In 2011, left-handed pitcher Ben Thomas became the first major-award winner of Googins's tenure when he was named A-10 Pitcher of the Year.  In 2013, Charles Leesman, who played for Xavier from 2006 to 2008, became Googins's first player to appear in Major League Baseball when he debuted for the Chicago White Sox.

Xavier returned to the NCAA Tournament in 2014, its first season in the new Big East Conference.  Xavier had an average regular season, going 8–10 in Big East play and qualifying as the last team into the Big East Tournament. While traveling to the tournament in Brooklyn, the team faced a flight delay, a flat tire on the bus to the hotel, and flooded hotel rooms. In the tournament itself, the fourth-seeded Musketeers dropped their opener to top-seeded Creighton, then won three straight games to win the championship and the conference's automatic bid.  Googins said to reporters of reaching his second NCAA Tournament: "I'm going to enjoy it this time. You don't realize that it doesn't happen all of the time. You can't take it for granted but I was really uptight the last time. Not that it's going to be loosey-goosey but we're going to go down there and it's another weekend. We're going to be ready to play but I'm going to enjoy it. It is a great experience."  At the Nashville Regional, Xavier again went 1–2, losing games against Vanderbilt and Oregon but eliminating third-seeded Clemson.

Head coaching record
Below is a table of Googins's records as a collegiate head baseball coach.

Personal
Googins is married to a former Xavier volleyball player and has three children, Ellie, Tommy, and Charlie.  In a 2012 interview, he said that he is a Cincinnati Reds fan and enjoys 80s music.

See also
 List of current NCAA Division I baseball coaches

References

External links
Official profile at GoXavier.com

Living people
People from Granville, Ohio
Ohio Wesleyan Battling Bishops baseball players
Indiana Hoosiers baseball coaches
Miami RedHawks baseball coaches
Xavier Musketeers baseball coaches
Baseball coaches from Ohio
Year of birth missing (living people)